In motorsport, the fastest lap is the quickest lap run during a race. Some racing series, like Formula One, Formula 2 and Formula E award championship points for a driver or team that set the fastest lap.

In Grand Prix motorcycle racing no point is awarded for the fastest lap. Giacomo Agostini holds the current record for the most fastest laps with 117.

Formula One

In Formula One, 136 different drivers have made fastest race laps. Since , the DHL Fastest Lap Award is given to the driver with the most fastest laps in a season. Until 1960, and since , an extra point is given to anyone in the points who records a fastest lap. Since 2019, for the point to be awarded, the driver achieving the fastest lap must finish the race in 10th position or better.

Fastest laps are often set during the final laps of a race. Lap times often decrease as tracks get "rubbered in" and fuel weights go down as a race progresses.

Setting the fastest lap is often considered an unofficial consolation prize for a driver that has had an incident that precluded a podium finish.

Formula One performance hybrid racecar 
In recent studies the LeMans endurance project has been reconfiguring Formula One racecars and making them faster by reconfiguring powertrain configurations. These powertrain reconfigurations have drastically been able to cut the time of the fastest lap achieveable by Formula One racecars. This team also studied the capabilities of Formula One racecars and studied how to improve the performance of the cars. Ultimately they designed a powertrain configuration that cut the fastest lap time achievable by a standard Formula One racecar by over 20 seconds.

Formula One aerodynamics studies 
A researcher at Durham University studied the aerodynamic effects on Formula One racecars and how to make them more efficient and ultimately faster. A Formula One racecar's lap time advantage is the result of the cornering performance of the vehicle. If the tyres can have more grip there would be more friction and less slippage which would allow the car to go faster through corners, and subsequently decrease the time it takes to complete a lap. Also if the powertrain had more power and if the car experienced less drag then it could achieve a faster lap time.

Grand Prix motorcycle racing

In Grand Prix motorcycle racing, which includes the 80cc, 125cc, 250cc, 350cc, 500cc, Moto3, Moto2 and MotoGP classes, Giacomo Agostini holds the record for the most fastest laps with 117, Valentino Rossi is second with 96 fastest laps and Ángel Nieto is third with 81.

Top ten riders in Grand Prix motorcycle racing with the most fastest laps

Autocross 
Autocross is a competition normally conducted by a single vehicle and driver on an open paved surface where the driver races against the clock while trying to achieve the fastest lap possible. In autocross drivers can learn how to achieve a faster lap through studying data of their vehicles. This data can be collected by many various systems and analyzed to produce faster more aerodynamic vehicles.

See also
List of Indianapolis 500 fastest laps

References

Formula One
Motorcycle racing
Motorsport terminology